Dom Bernard Orchard (3 May 1910 – 28 November 2006) was an English Catholic Benedictine monk, headmaster and biblical scholar.

Early life and education
John Archibald Henslowe Orchard, the son of a farmer, was born in Bromley, Kent. He was educated at Ealing Priory School (to which he would in later life return as headmaster), and on leaving in 1927 became its first pupil since foundation in 1902 to go to university, winning a place at Fitzwilliam House, in the University of Cambridge, where he read History and Economics. At Ealing Priory he shared classes with Reginald C. Fuller with whom he would in later life collaborate on scholarly projects.

Monk
After graduating, Orchard taught initially at a preparatory school before in 1932 taking the monastic habit at Downside Abbey, adopting the name Bernard; he was subsequently ordained as a priest in 1939. At Downside he both taught at the school, served as choirmaster and began his career as a biblical scholar under the tutelage of Abbots John Chapman and Christopher Butler. From 1943 he took advantage of the influence of Divino afflante Spiritu, the encyclical of Pope Pius XII, to embark upon A Catholic Commentary on Holy Scripture, eventually published in 1951.

St. Benedict's School
After 13 years at Downside, then-Abbot Sigebert Trafford instructed Orchard to take on the headship of Ealing Priory School. Established in 1902 as a dependency of Downside, by 1945 it was in a state in which closure rather than further development seemed more likely. Notwithstanding, Orchard threw himself into the task of revitalising the school, which he renamed St Benedict's School, and by 1947 succeeded in obtaining recognition by the Ministry of Education as efficient (thus enabling it to participate in the teachers' pension scheme). 

In 1951 Orchard was admitted to the Headmasters' Conference, giving St Benedict's the status of a public school, the only Catholic day school to achieve this position. By 1959, Abbot Rupert Hall of the by-then independent Ealing Abbey, was concerned that Orchard's ambitions for the school exceeded the financial capability of the monastic community, and requested that Orchard resign his position as headmaster in 1960. Orchard's successor died after just one term and the monk then appointed in his stead resigned after five years. This resulted in Orchard being called upon  in 1965 to resume the post. He held until a further dispute over his ambitions for expansion led  in 1969 to his resignation a second time.

Biblical Scholar
After completing his biblical commentary in 1951, and in addition to his headmaster's duties, Orchard embarked with Reginald C. Fuller, his erstwhile fellow Ealing Priory pupil, on producing a new translation of the Bible, suitable for both liturgical and academic use, which was published in 1967. Aged 60, free from stewardship of the school, Orchard resumed his career as a biblical scholar in earnest. He participated in the establishment in 1969 and was the second General Secretary (1970–1972) of the World Catholic Federation and, displaying the same vigour evident in his revival of St Benedict's School, organised and financed a series of international conferences on the Gospels. During the 1970s he spent four years as spiritual director of the Beda College in Rome and took up the position of visiting professor of New Testament Studies at the University of Dallas (in Dallas, Texas) before returning to Ealing for the remainder of his life. 

Following in the footsteps of his mentor Christopher Butler, Orchard promoted, in the face of general scholarly scepticism, the Griesbach hypothesis, which he renamed the Two-Gospel Hypothesis. This maintained that the Gospel of Matthew was the first and the Gospel of Mark the third, being a synthesis of Matthew's Gospel and the Gospel of Luke. Into his old age he remained a familiar face in biblical circles, lecturing worldwide in support of his hypothesis. Aged 95, he publicly declined the invitation of Cormac Murphy-O'Connor, the Archbishop of Westminster to attend a lecture which would support the priority of Mark's Gospel. Orchard's researches and ideas, regarding the Gospels, have been saved on www.churchinhistory.org

Death
After leading the chant at midday on 28 November 2006, Orchard, aged 96, prayed at the bedside of the dying Dom Kevin Horsey. They were the last survivors of the Ealing community before it became independent in 1947. They died within hours of each other that night.

Works

Books

 - originally The evolution of the Gospels (1990)

Edited by

Chapters

Journal articles

References

1910 births
2006 deaths
Alumni of Fitzwilliam College, Cambridge
20th-century British Roman Catholic theologians
20th-century English Roman Catholic priests
Benedictine Biblical scholars
Benedictine theologians
English Benedictines
New Testament scholars
People from Bromley
People educated at St Benedict's School, Ealing
Roman Catholic biblical scholars
Roman Catholic writers
University of Dallas faculty